Pelagirhabdus alkalitolerans is a Gram-positive, alkalitolerant, rod-shaped and non-motile bacterium from the genus of Pelagirhabdus which has been isolated from the beach of Pingaleswar in India.

References

 

Bacillaceae
Bacteria described in 2016